Odontotermes redemanni, is a species of termite of the genus Odontotermes. It is native to India and Sri Lanka. It damages wooden constructions. It is a pest of sugarcane, tea and coconut. They construct termitaria during November to March when rainfall and ambient temperature become low. Underground termite nests of this species are a natural host for the important Traditional Chinese Medicine fungus Xylaria nigripes, also known as Wu Ling Shen.

References

External links
Mathematical demography of odontotermes redemanni
Semiochemicals of Odontotermes redemanni
Developmental stages of Odontotermes redemanni, Wasmann
Chromosome Morphology During the Spermatogenesis of Odontotermes Redemanni (Wasmann)
POSSIBLE FACTOR RESPONSIBLE FOR THE SPECIFIC GROWTH OF XYLARIA NIGRIPES IN THE ‘FUNGUS GARDENS’ OF THE MOUNDS OF THE TERMITE, ODONTOTERMES REDEMANNI

 

Termites
Insects described in 1893
Insects of Sri Lanka